TV Time is a social television and tracking website that allows users to report what television series and movies they have seen.

Most followed television series 

As of March 9, 2023, the most followed television shows on TV Time are:

Most followed films 

As of June 18, 2021, the most followed films on TV Time were:

References 

Lists of Internet-related superlatives
21st century-related lists